Mabley is a surname. Notable people with the surname include:

 Moms Mabley (1894–1975), American comedian
 Jack Mabley (1915–2006), American reporter and columnist
 C. R. Mabley (1836–1885), Founder of chain of department stores in the United States

See also
 Mabley and Carew, US Department store
 Mabley Developmental Center, Illinois state centre for mentally disabled, Dixon, Illinois
 Smith and Mabley, New York City automobile manufacturer